Oregon Route 130, known as the Little Nestucca Highway No. 130 (see Oregon highways and routes), is an Oregon state highway which runs through the Oregon Coast Range, between Oretown and Dolph.

Route description
The western terminus of Oregon Route 130 is at intersection with U.S. Route 101 in Oretown, near Nestucca Bay.

History
Oregon Route 130 is a post-2002 number, and until recently did not have posted route markers.  However, it appeared on the 2009-2011 official Oregon State Highway Map, and in November 2011 shields for 130 were posted at both its ends.

Major intersections

References

External links
Oregon Highways and Routes: Secondary State Highways

130
Transportation in Tillamook County, Oregon